The Chief of Staff of the Indonesian Army (abbreviated KSAD or KASAD) is the highest position in the Indonesian Army. The position is held by the four-star General appointed by and reporting directly to the Commander of the Armed Forces. Chief of Staff is assisted by the Vice Chief of Staff of the Indonesian Army, which the position is held by a three-star General. 

The current officeholder is General Dudung Abdurachman, who took office on 17 November 2021.

List of officeholders

See also
Commander of the Indonesian National Armed Forces
Chief of Staff of the Indonesian Navy
Chief of Staff of the Indonesian Air Force

References

Chiefs of Staff of the Indonesian Army
Indonesia